Cameron Heights may refer to:

 Cameron Heights Collegiate Institute
 Cameron Heights, Edmonton